Shmuel "Mooki" Katz  (  9 December 1914 – 9 May 2008) was an Israeli writer, historian and journalist. Prior to the formation of the State of Israel, he was a Zionist activist and member of the Irgun High Command. He was a member of the first Knesset and is also known for his biography of Jewish leader Ze'ev Jabotinsky.

Biography
Katz was born in Johannesburg, South Africa. His parents were Alexander and Luba Katz. In 1930, he joined the Betar movement. In 1936, Katz immigrated to Mandatory Palestine as the secretary of Michael Haskel, the South African honorary consul. Soon after his arrival, he joined the Irgun. In 1939, he was sent to London by Ze'ev Jabotinsky to speak on issues concerning Palestine. While there he founded the revisionist publication “The Jewish Standard” and was its editor, 1939–1941, and in 1945.

In 1946, Katz returned to Mandatory Palestine and joined the HQ of the Irgun where he was active in the aspect of foreign relations. He was one of the seven members of the high command of the Irgun, as well as a spokesman of the organization. Katz also served as Irgun commander in Jerusalem during the War of Independence. Menachem Begin writes in "The Revolt" that Katz "was the officer responsible for Jerusalem until the dissolution of the military regiments of the Irgun Zvai Leumi."

Political career
In 1977, Katz became "Adviser to the Prime Minister for Information Abroad" to Menachem Begin. He accompanied Begin on two trips to Washington, D.C. and was asked to explain some points to President Jimmy Carter. He quit this task on January 5, 1978 because of differences with the cabinet over peace proposals with Egypt. Katz was then active with the Tehiya party for some years and later with Herut – The National Movement after it split away from the ruling Likud.

Literary career
Katz's Battleground: Fact and Fantasy in Palestine describes the roots of the Arab–Israeli conflict and attempts to refute anti-Zionist myths and Arab propaganda. Katz is the author of a two-volume biography of Jabotinsky entitled Lone Wolf, A Biography of Vladimir (Ze'ev) Jabotinsky. In addition, he published a regular column for many years in The Jerusalem Post.

Published works

Books
 Days of Fire (1966, Hebrew; 1968, English edition by Doubleday)

References

External links
 
 Fact and Fantasy in the Holy Land EretzYisrael.Org
 AFSI Honors Shmuel Katz MidEast Outpost
 Shmuel Katz: Recent articles  Freeman Center for Strategic Studies

1914 births
2008 deaths
20th-century biographers
Betar members
burials at Yarkon Cemetery
Herut – The National Movement politicians
Herut politicians
Irgun members
Israeli biographers
Israeli historians
Israeli Jews
Jewish historians
members of the 1st Knesset (1949–1951)
Movement for Greater Israel politicians
South African emigrants to Mandatory Palestine
South African Jews
Tehiya politicians